The  2020–21 FC Chambly Oise season was the club's 31st season in existence and its second consecutive season in the second division of French football. In addition to the domestic league, Chambly participated in this season's edition of the Coupe de France. The season covered the period from 1 July 2020 to 30 June 2021.

Players

First-team squad
As of 13 November 2019.

 (on loan from Nîmes)

Transfers

In

Out

Loan in

Pre-season and friendlies

Competitions

Overview

Ligue 2

League table

Results summary

Results by round

Matches
The league fixtures were announced on 9 July 2020.

Coupe de France

References

External links

FC Chambly Oise seasons
FC Chambly